The 2019–20 EIHL season was the 17th season of the Elite Ice Hockey League. The regular season commenced on 7 September 2019 and was due to end on 29 March 2020, with the playoffs following in April 2020. The reigning league champions were the Belfast Giants, who won the title on the final day of the regular season, in 2018–19.

On 13 March 2020, two weekends before the regular season was due to end, league officials cancelled all remaining matches due to be held; this was as a result of the COVID-19 pandemic in the United Kingdom.

Teams

After having eleven teams for the 2018–19 season, the league reduced to ten for the 2019–20 season. This was due to the Milton Keynes Lightning – who had finished bottom of the league – returning to the National Ice Hockey League. For the first time since 2011–12, the league did not feature Conference splits.

League standings at time of cancellation
Each team was scheduled to play 54 games, playing each of the other nine teams six times: three times on home ice, and three times away from home. Points were awarded for each game, where two points are awarded for all victories, regardless of whether it was in regulation time or after overtime or game-winning shots. One point was awarded for losing in overtime or game-winning shots, and zero points for losing in regulation time. At the end of the regular season, the team that finished with the most points would normally be crowned the league champion.

However, after the coronavirus pandemic forced the cancellation of the season, it was agreed the season would finish without a league winner; Sheffield Steelers won the Challenge Cup; league leaders Cardiff Devils qualified for the 2020–21 Champions Hockey League.

Statistics

Scoring leaders

The following players led the league in points, at the conclusion of matches played on 8 March 2020. If two or more skaters are tied (i.e. same number of points, goals and played games), all of the tied skaters are shown.

Leading goaltenders
The following goaltenders led the league in goals against average, at the conclusion of matches played on 8 March 2020, providing they had played 1080 minutes.

References

External links

Elite Ice Hockey League seasons
2019–20 in British ice hockey
United
EIHL season